Chase & Sanborn Coffee is an American brand of coffee created by the coffee roasting and tea and coffee importing company of the same name, established in 1864 in Boston, Massachusetts by Caleb Chase (1831-1908) and James Solomon Sanborn (1835-1903). It says that it is the first coffee company to pack and ship roasted coffee in sealed tins.

History
When Standard Brands was formed in 1929, it acquired Chase & Sanborn, where it remained until 1981 when the company merged into Nabisco. Nabisco sold Chase & Sanborn to Florida importer General Coffee Co. owned by Colombian Alberto Duque in 1982. 

Duque's creditors sold the business to Hills Bros. which bought the company in 1984; Nestle became the new parent in 1985. Nestle sold its US coffee business to Sara Lee in 1999, and the Chase & Sanborn, Hills Bros., MJB, and Chock Full O' Nuts brands were sold to Massimo Zanetti Beverage Group in 2006.

Gallery

References

Further reading

 
 "Caleb Chase."

External links
Arabica Green Coffee

Coffee brands
Nabisco brands
Massimo Zanetti brands
Economic history of Boston
Financial District, Boston
Sara Lee Corporation brands
1862 establishments in Massachusetts
Coffee companies of the United States
American companies established in 1862